Wilhelm Hofmeister (1912–1978) was the BMW design chief from 1955 to 1970.

Trained as an engineer at the Hamburg Wagenbauschule, he was more a skillful manager than a stylist.  He is credited with the design of the BMW New Class and the Hofmeister kink is named after him.

Hofmeister's predecessor at BMW was Peter Szymanowski and his successor was Paul Bracq.

References

External links 
 
 

1912 births
1978 deaths
German automobile designers
BMW designers